Ray Gardner may refer to:
Ray Gardner (All My Children)
Ray Gardner (baseball) (1901–1968), baseball player